Ladislav Tikal (25 May 1905 in Soběslav – 30 June 1980 in Prague) was a Czechoslovak gymnast who competed in the 1928 Summer Olympics.

References

1905 births
1980 deaths
Czech male artistic gymnasts
Czechoslovak male artistic gymnasts
Olympic gymnasts of Czechoslovakia
Gymnasts at the 1928 Summer Olympics
Olympic silver medalists for Czechoslovakia
Olympic medalists in gymnastics
Medalists at the 1928 Summer Olympics
People from Tábor District
Sportspeople from the South Bohemian Region